Menzelinsk is an airport in Russia located 3 km west of Menzelinsk, in the Kama river valley. It is a civilian airfield with small tarmac.

Menzelinsk drop zone
Menzelinsk airport is currently known as Menzelinsk drop zone. It operate two turboprop aircraft -- L-410 and An-28, and a number of smaller aircraft, like An-2. There is a hotel, canteen, rent and a heated packing rooms.

The first parachute jump can be performed with static-line Soviet parachute D-6, or a modern free-fall tandem jump. There is an Accelerated Free Fall program to advance and a series of special courses for Tandem Masters, AFF instructors and wingsuit instructors.

Landing area for parachuting is 1700×800 meters.

World Championships 2010
World parachuting championships 2010 in formation skydiving, canopy formation and artistic events (freestyle and freefly) were held from 29 July to 5 August 2010.

Incidents and accidents
 On October 10, 2021, a Let-410 aircraft belonging to an air club crashed upon take-off from the airport, killing 16 (initially, 19 were reported dead) and injuring 3.

References

External links 
 Dropzone Menzelinsk Website
 Menzelinsk drop zone - Archived copy

Airports built in the Soviet Union
Airports in Tatarstan